Maestro is an album by American blues artist Taj Mahal. It was nominated for Best Contemporary Blues Album at the 2009 Grammy Awards (but lost out to Dr. John and the Lower 911's City That Care Forgot).

The release of Maestro marked the 40th anniversary of Taj Mahal's career as a recording artist. It features numerous guest artists: Los Lobos appear on "Never Let You Go" and "TV Mama", Jack Johnson shares vocals on a re-recording of Taj's number "Further On Down the Road", and Ben Harper's vocals can be heard on "Dust Me Down". Other guest appearances include Angélique Kidjo (on "Zanzibar") and Ziggy Marley (on "Black Man, Brown Man"). Furthermore, Taj Mahal teams up again with the Phantom Blues Band (with whom he had recorded the Grammy nominated albums Señor Blues and Shoutin' in Key), Toumani Diabaté (with whom he had recorded the album Kulanjan) and his daughter, singer-songwriter Deva Mahal (with whom he had recorded several children's albums in the past).

Track listing
 "Scratch My Back" (James Moore)
 "Never Let You Go" (Deva Mahal, Taj Mahal)
 "Dust Me Down" (Ben Harper)
 "Further On Down the Road" (Jesse Edwin Davis III, Taj Mahal)
 "Black Man Brown Man" (Taj Mahal)
 "Zanzibar" (Angélique Kidjo, Taj Mahal)
 "TV Mama" (Lou Willie Turner)
 "I Can Make You Happy" (Taj Mahal)
 "Slow Drag" (Taj Mahal)
 "Hello Josephine" (Dave Bartholomew, Antoine Domino)
 "Strong Man Holler" (Taj Mahal)
 "Diddy Wah Diddy" (Ellas McDaniel, Willie Dixon)
 "Mambo No. 5 (7-11)" (vinyl bonus track)
 "On A Little Bamboo Bridge" (vinyl bonus track)

Personnel
Taj Mahal – vocals, guitar, harmonica, ukulele
Louie Pérez – guitar
Johnny Lee Schell – guitar
Cesar Rosas – guitar
Leo Nocentelli – guitar
David Hidalgo – guitar
Jason Mozersky – guitar
Takeshi Akimoto – guitar
Fred Lunt – guitar
Carlos Andrade – guitar
Larry Fulcher – bass
Conrad Lozano – bass
Bill Rich – bass
Jesse Ingalls – bass
Paul "Pablo" Stennett – bass
George Porter – bass
Pancho Graham – acoustic bass, guitar
Tony Braunagel – drums
Cougar Estrada – drums
Raymond Weber – drums
Carlton "Santa" Davis – drums
Kester Smith – drums, percussions
Michael Jerome – drums, percussions
Angel Roché Jr. – percussions
Debra Dobkin – percussions
Toumani Diabaté – kora
Mike Finnigan – keyboards
Jason Yates – keyboards
Michael Hyde – keyboards
Mick Weaver – keyboards, organ
Henry Butler – piano
Steve Berlin – organ
Ivan Neville – organ
Joe Sublette – baritone saxophone
Joe Sublett – tenor saxophone
Rudy Costa – alto saxophone, clarinet
Darrel Leonard – trombone
Angela Wellman – trombone
Billy Branch – harmonica
Pat Cockett – ukulele
Bassekou Kouyate – ngoni, xalam
Ziggy Marley – vocals
Angélique Kidjo – vocals
Ben Harper – vocals
Jack Johnson – vocals
C.C. White – backing vocals
Pebbles Phillips – backing vocals
Tracy Hazzard – backing vocals

References

Taj Mahal (musician) albums
2008 albums
Heads Up International albums